The 2019 Maia Challenger was a professional tennis tournament played on clay courts. It was the first edition of the tournament which was part of the 2019 ATP Challenger Tour. It took place in Maia, Portugal from 18 to 24 November 2019.

Singles main-draw entrants

Seeds

 1 Rankings are as of 11 November 2019.

Other entrants
The following players received wildcards into the singles main draw:
  Nuno Borges
  Francisco Cabral
  Tiago Cação
  Luís Faria
  João Monteiro

The following players received entry into the singles main draw using protected rankings:
  Íñigo Cervantes
  Carlos Gómez-Herrera
  Javier Martí
  Maximilian Neuchrist

The following player received entry into the singles main draw as an alternate:
  Riccardo Bonadio

The following players received entry from the qualifying draw:
  Fabrizio Ornago
  Andrea Vavassori

The following players received entry as lucky losers:
  Fábio Coelho
  Maxime Hamou

Champions

Singles

  Jozef Kovalík def.  Constant Lestienne 6–0, 6–4.

Doubles

  Andre Begemann /  Daniel Masur def.  Guillermo García López /  David Vega Hernández 7–6(7–2), 6–4.

References

2019 ATP Challenger Tour
November 2019 sports events in Portugal
2019 in Portuguese tennis